The 2009 Seguros Bolívar Open Bucaramanga was a professional tennis tournament played on outdoor red clay courts. It was part of the 2009 ATP Challenger Tour. It took place in Bucaramanga, Colombia between 26 January and 1 February 2009.

Singles main draw entrants

Seeds

 Rankings are as of January 19, 2009

Other entrants
The following players received wildcards into the singles main draw:
  Sat Galán
  Filip Krajinović
  Carlos Salamanca
  Michael Quintero

The following players received entry from the qualifying draw:
  Jorge Aguilar
  Enrico Burzi
  Eric Gomes
  Grzegorz Panfil
  Alejandro Fabbri (as a Lucky loser)

The following players received entry into the singles main draw as special exempt:
  Guillermo Hormazábal

Champions

Men's singles

 Horacio Zeballos def.  Carlos Salamanca, 7–5, 6–2

Men's doubles

 Diego Álvarez /  Carles Poch-Gradin def.  Carlos Avellán /  Eric Gomes, 7–6(7), 6–1

External links
Official site of Seguros Bolívar Tennis

Seguros Bolivar Open Bucaramanga
Tennis tournaments in Colombia
Seguros Bolívar Open Bucaramanga
2009 in Colombian tennis